The Noye is a river in the Hauts-de-France region of northern France.

The Noye is located in the northern part of the Picard plateau. It is the left tributary of the Avre river, which is itself a left tributary of the Somme.

References

Rivers of Oise
Rivers of Somme (department)
Rivers of France
Rivers of Hauts-de-France